Leonard Hutton (April 13, 1908 – September 29, 1976) was a Canadian athlete who competed in the 1932 Summer Olympics.

He was born in Montreal, Quebec. In 1932 he participated in the long jump event but was unable to set a mark. At the 1930 Empire Games he won the gold medal in the long jump competition and the bronze medal in the triple jump contest. He was a member of the Montreal AAA Winged Wheelers team that won the Grey Cup in 1931.

External links

Len Hutton's obituary

1908 births
1976 deaths
Canadian male long jumpers
Canadian male triple jumpers
Olympic track and field athletes of Canada
Athletes (track and field) at the 1932 Summer Olympics
Athletes (track and field) at the 1930 British Empire Games
Commonwealth Games gold medallists for Canada
Commonwealth Games bronze medallists for Canada
Commonwealth Games medallists in athletics
Anglophone Quebec people
Athletes from Montreal
Players of Canadian football from Quebec
20th-century Canadian people
Medallists at the 1930 British Empire Games